The 2007 NCAA Rifle Championships were contested at the 28th annual NCAA-sanctioned competition to determine the team and individual national champions of co-ed collegiate rifle shooting in the United States. 

The championships were held at the E.F. Horton Rifle Range at the University of Alaska Fairbanks in Fairbanks, Alaska.

Hosts and defending champions Alaska won the team championship, the Nanooks' ninth NCAA national title in rifle.

Qualification
With only one national collegiate championship for rifle shooting, all NCAA rifle programs (whether from Division I, Division II, or Division III) were eligible. A total of eight teams contested this championship.

Results
Scoring:  The championship consisted of 60 shots for both smallbore and air rifle per team.

Team title
(DC) = Defending champions
Italics = Inaugural championship

Individual events

References

NCAA Rifle Championship
NCAA Rifle Championships
2007 in shooting sports
NCAA Rifle Championships